NHO or nho may refer to:

 Confederation of Norwegian Enterprise (NHO), an employers organisation in Norway
 National Hydrographic Office, headquarters of the Indian Naval Hydrographic Department
 Natural hybrid orbitals, one of a set of natural localized orbital sets in quantum chemistry, see Natural bond orbital
 Takuu language, a Polynesian language spoken in Papua New Guinea (iso 639-3: nho)
 Nitroxyl, a chemical compound well known in the gas phase, with the formula NHO

See also